Dumbreck Castle was a tower house, dating from the 16th century, around  west of Ellon, in Aberdeenshire, Scotland.

Alternative names were Drumbeck Castle and Mains Of Dumbreck.

History

The property was owned by the Dumbreck family.  It passed to the Meldrum family who built the castle.

Structure

None of the property remains.  Architectural fragments have been built into farm buildings.  The left hand part of a gun loop is built into the east-north-east gable of the farmhouse, while a carved fragment of stone is built into the north wall of the farm outbuilding to its east.

For stylistic reasons it has been suggested that this was the work of Thomas Leper.

References

Castles in Aberdeenshire